The Republic of Vevčani, also known as the Independent Republic of Vevčani, was a short lived self-proclaimed country on the territory of North Macedonia after the breakup of Yugoslavia in 1991 and is now a symbolic micronation. The residents of the same-named village created their own state after the Vevčani Emergency in 1987, when the Communist government attempted to redirect the water springs of the village. The self-proclaimed republic was declared on 19 September 1991. They made their own coat of arms – two harlequins dancing over a cauldron. They also issued red passports. A currency was created as a souvenir. On 8 April 1993, Vevčani fell under the jurisdiction of the Struga Municipality and the republic came to an end. In 2000 it was recreated as a model country to attract tourism.

History 
During the Vevčani Emergency, the police used electric batons for the first time in the former Yugoslavia to stop a protest. The protests set up barricades and were beaten for weeks until the government backed off. On 19 September 1991, 11 days after the declaration of independence of Macedonia, the Vevčani declared a state. They stashed guns and demanded to be left alone.

In 2002 The New York Times said:
The Vevčani created their own currency, the ličnik, to hand out as souvenirs. The currency came in 8 denominations of 1, 2, 5, 10, 50, 100, 500 and 1,000. The designer was Simun Lesoski. 

On 7 August 2020, the anniversary of the Emergency, in cooperation with the mayor of the municipality, the cryptocurrency "crypto ličnik" was launched. It was made by Jordan Stojanovski. This is the official cryptocurrency of the now symbolic country.

See also 
 Vevčani
 Vevčani Municipality

References

Further reading 
 Macedonia: country for 20 years, 2011
 Republic of Macedonia, independent and free, 1998

History of North Macedonia
Republics
States and territories established in 1991
Republic